Janika is a 1949 Hungarian comedy film directed by Márton Keleti and starring Ida Turay, Sándor Szabó and Mária Mezei.

Cast
 Ida Turay - Gizi / Janika 
 Sándor Szabó - Balla János 
 Mária Mezei - Daisy 
 Gyula Gózon - Edus bácsi 
 Hilda Gobbi - Malvin 
 László Kemény - Adorján 
 Edit Hlatky - Vera 
 Ella Gombaszögi - Gizi mamája 
 Gábor Rajnay - Gizi papája 
 Kálmán Latabár - Fenek Jenõ 
 Márta Fónay - Bözsike 
 László Keleti - Pincér 
 Sándor Kömíves

External links

1949 films
Hungarian comedy films
1940s Hungarian-language films
Films directed by Márton Keleti
Hungarian films based on plays
1949 comedy films
Hungarian black-and-white films